The 1952 Gent–Wevelgem was the 14th edition of the Gent–Wevelgem cycle race and was held on 3 April 1952. The race started in Ghent and finished in Wevelgem. The race was won by Raymond Impanis.

General classification

References

Gent–Wevelgem
1952 in road cycling
1952 in Belgian sport
April 1952 sports events in Europe